Victoria Kaláberová (born 7 July 2001) is a Slovakian professional footballer who plays as a striker for Icelandic club Afturelding.

Club career
Kaláberová won the Slovak Women's First League twice with Slovan Bratislava before moving to Real Oviedo. After scoring seven goals in 16 league games with Aris Limassol, she transferred to Afturelding in a series of transfers that also included Greece international Maria Paterna.

International career
Kaláberová made her debut for the Slovakia national team on 13 April 2021, coming on as a substitute for Patrícia Fischerová against Slovenia.

Personal life 
Kaláberová was born in New York. She is a fan of FC Barcelona.

References 

2001 births
Living people
People with acquired Slovak citizenship
Slovak women's footballers
Women's association football forwards
Slovakia women's international footballers
Slovak expatriate footballers
Slovak expatriate sportspeople in Cyprus
Expatriate women's footballers in Cyprus
Soccer players from New York (state)
American women's soccer players
American expatriate women's soccer players
American expatriate sportspeople in Cyprus
American people of Slovak descent
Úrvalsdeild kvenna (football) players
Real Oviedo (women) players
ŠK Slovan Bratislava (women) players
Slovak Women's First League players